Chris Wilson (born September 10, 1952 in Waltham, Massachusetts) is a guitarist and multi instrumentalist, most known for his role as the singer of the best-remembered line-up San Francisco band the Flamin' Groovies, having replaced original singer Roy Loney in 1971. With Wilson on lead vocals, the band released their influential 1976 album Shake Some Action.

His song "Shake Some Action", co-written with Cyril Jordan, appeared in the 1995 movie Clueless.

He was also a long-term member of The Barracudas and in 1993 he released the mini-album Pop backed by The Sneetches and the debut solo album Random Centuries.

He released his second solo album, Second Life, with various  session musicians, including  Greg Paulett on drums, in 2008. His 3rd solo album released in 2013, “It’s Flamin Groovy” was the impetus for the Flamin’ Groovies reunion that same year. The album featured former band mates Cyril Jordan, Roy Loney, Michael Wilhelm, George Alexander and James Ferrell.

The reunited Flamin’ Groovies, Chris Wilson, Cyril Jordan and George Alexander with new drummer Victor Penalosa. This lineup toured the world from 2013-2017 and released the first new full length album, “Fantastic Plastic” in 2017.

Chris returned to the United States in 2014 where he presently lives in Oregon and has retired from live performances in 2019.

References

American rock guitarists
American male guitarists
Living people
1952 births
People from Waltham, Massachusetts
Guitarists from Massachusetts
20th-century American guitarists
Sire Records artists
20th-century American male musicians